The Northwood Bridge, also known as Goose River Bridge, was a historic  bridge across the Goose River about  from Northwood, North Dakota. Dating from 1906, it was significant as a relatively rare example of a half-hip type of Pratt pony truss bridge. It was also significant as the oldest surviving documented bridge in Grand Forks County, North Dakota. The bridge was listed on the National Register of Historic Places in 1997.  It was destroyed by an overweight load in 2019.

Another bridge on the same river, the Goose River Bridge, is also NRHP-listed in North Dakota. The Northwood Bridge was listed a few months later.

The Northwood Bridge was one of ten bridges of the Fargo Bridge & Iron Co. in North Dakota that were listed on the National Register.

Collapse
On July 22, 2019, at approximately 1:15 pm, a 2005 Peterbilt  tractor trailer driven by Michael Dodds and loaded with dry beans attempted to cross over the restricted-weight bridge. The bridge collapsed, and the trailer became hung up on the west abutment. The bridge was rated for  gross weight, with restrictions marked. An overload citation of $11,400 was issued. Dodds was uninjured. The estimated replacement cost of the bridge is between $800,000.00 and $1,000,000.

References

Road bridges on the National Register of Historic Places in North Dakota
Pratt truss bridges in the United States
Bridges completed in 1906
National Register of Historic Places in Grand Forks County, North Dakota
1906 establishments in North Dakota
Former National Register of Historic Places in North Dakota
Transportation in Grand Forks County, North Dakota
Iron bridges in the United States
Ruined bridges
Bridges over the Goose River (North Dakota)